Joseph Arthur Edwards (5 March 1907 – 1997) was an English professional footballer who played in the Football League for Mansfield Town.

References

1907 births
1997 deaths
English footballers
Association football goalkeepers
English Football League players
Chesterfield F.C. players
Derby County F.C. players
Bolsover Colliery F.C. players
Mansfield Town F.C. players
Ollerton Colliery F.C. players